MASH ("Modern American Steak House")
is a chain of high-end steakhouses based in Copenhagen, Denmark.

History
The first Mash steakhouse opened on Bredgade in Copenhagen in 2009. In 2012, a Mash restaurant opened in a building owned by Crown Estates on Brewer Street in London's Soho neighbourhood. In April 2013, The Telegraph commented that the team behind Mash had "set the London steakhouse scene on fire" with their restaurant which won the award for Restaurant of the Year at the 2013 London Lifestyle Awards. The first Mash restaurant in Germany opened on Große Elbstrasse in Hamburg in August 2015.

Ownership
Mash is owned by Copenhagen Concepts which also runs the restaurants Le Sommelier  and Umami. Jesper Boelskifte is CEO of the company. The group of owners also include Mikkel Glahn and Erik Gemal. The chef Francis Cardenau, one of the founding partners, sold his share of the company in 2017.

Restaurants
Denmark
 Mash City, Bredgade, Copenhagen
 Mash Airport, Copenhagen Airport, Copenhagen
 Mash Penthouse, Tivoli Hotel and Congress Center, Kalvebod Brygge, Copenhagen
 Mash Skovriderkroen, Charlottenlund, Copenhagen
 Mash Rungsted, Rungsted Marina, Rungsted, Copenhagen
 Mash Aarhus, Aarhus, Aarhus
 MASH Odense, Odense

UK
 Mash London, Brewer Street, London

Germany
 MASH Düsseldorf, Düsseldorf
 MASH Hamburg, Hamburg

References

External links
 Official website

Steakhouses
Restaurants in Copenhagen
Restaurants in London
Restaurants in Aarhus
Restaurant chains in Denmark
Restaurants established in 2009
Danish companies established in 2009
Companies based in Copenhagen Municipality